Clube Esportivo Bento Gonçalves, commonly referred to as Esportivo, is a Brazilian football club based in Bento Gonçalves, Rio Grande do Sul. It currently plays in Campeonato Gaúcho Série A, the first level of the Rio Grande do Sul state football league.

History
On August 28, 1919, Clube Esportivo Bento Gonçalves was founded by Leonardo Carlucci and other sportsmen.

In 1969, the club won the Campeonato Gaúcho Second Level, beating by W.O. Avenida.

In 1979, Esportivo finished as Campeonato Gaúcho runner-up, ahead of Internacional.

In 1989, the club competed in the Brazilian Championship Second Level, but was eliminated in the first stage of the competition.

In 1999, the Esportivo de Bento Gonçalves won again the Campeonato Gaúcho Second Level, finishing ahead of 15 de Novembro, Glória and Rio Grande in the final stage, which was a group stage competed by four clubs.

In 2004, Esportivo won the Copa FGF, beating Gaúcho de Passo Fundo in the final round.

They won the Campeonato Gaúcho Second Level again in 2012.

Achievements
 Campeonato Gaúcho:
 Runners-up (1): 1979
 Campeonato Gaúcho Second Level:
 Winners (4): 1969, 1999, 2012, 2022
 Copa FGF:
 Winners (1): 2004

Stadium
Esportivo's stadium is Estádio Parque Esportivo Montanha dos Vinhedos, inaugurated in 2004, with a maximum capacity of 15,000 people.

Players

References

External links
 Clube Esportivo Bento Gonçalves official website

Association football clubs established in 1919
Football clubs in Rio Grande do Sul
1919 establishments in Brazil